

List

See also
WNBA
WNBA Draft
WNBA All-Star Game
WNBA MVP
WNBA Playoffs
WNBA Finals

External links
WNBA website
WNBA Awards/History
WNBA Playoff History

 
Seasons
Women's sport-related lists